Cecilia Ekelundh (born 19 February 1978) is a Swedish golfer.

Career
She turned professional in 2000 and was a Ladies European Tour rookie in 2002. She won on tour for the first time at the 2004 Ladies Open of Portugal. In 2005, she successfully defended that title in 2005 and also won the inaugural Volvo Cross Country Challenge. In 2006, she won the Ladies' English Open.

Professional wins (4)

Ladies European Tour wins (3)

Other wins (1)
2005 Volvo Cross Country Challenge (unofficial tournament sanctioned by the Ladies European Tour)

References

External links

LPGA Tour profile

Swedish female golfers
Tulsa Golden Hurricane women's golfers
Ladies European Tour golfers
LPGA Tour golfers
South Carolina Gamecocks women's golfers
Sportspeople from Blekinge County
People from Karlskrona
1978 births
Living people